Portrait Monument is a 1920 marble sculpture by Adelaide Johnson, installed in the U.S. Capitol's rotunda, in Washington, D.C. The artwork was dedicated in 1921 and features portrait busts of Elizabeth Cady Stanton, Susan B. Anthony, and Lucretia Mott.

See also
 Women's Rights Pioneers Monument, 2020 statue in New York City
 Statue of Elizabeth Cady Stanton, 2021 statue in Johnston, New York
 List of monuments and memorials to women's suffrage

References

External links

 

1920 sculptures
1921 establishments in Washington, D.C.
Busts in Washington, D.C.
Cultural depictions of Susan B. Anthony
Elizabeth Cady Stanton
Monuments and memorials in Washington, D.C.
Monuments and memorials to women's suffrage in the United States
Sculptures of women in Washington, D.C.
United States Capitol art